"Ice Tubig" is a single by Filipino rapper and songwriter Gloc-9 featuring Mike Luis. The song was set to be released in July 2017 but eventually moved a month later. It will be part of his five-track EP entitled Rotonda under Universal Records Philippines which will be released months later. In the Philippines, the term ice tubig or ice water is a cold water in ice plastic bag that is intended to be made and sold as ice but is bought even the water go frozen for the customer to drink immediately.

Background and composition
After his one-project deal with Star Records, Gloc-9 returns to Universal Records Philippines label. On his return to Universal Records, also in celebration of his twentieth year in Philippine music industry, Gloc-9 recorded an EP entitled Rotonda in which Ice Tubig will be his first single off the album.
The song is about a girl whose love for his partner went cold as compared to the ice tubig. Ice Tubig is a light dance track which Gloc-9 admits that he has never done for a long time.

Track listing

References

2017 singles
Gloc-9 songs
2017 songs
Songs written by Gloc-9
Tagalog-language songs